In March 2013, Lockheed Martin announced that it was developing a family of membranes made from graphene, under the trademark Perforene.

The most promising application is seawater desalination.  With holes as small as one nanometer in diameter, the membranes would trap sodium, chlorine and other ions, while allowing water molecules to pass through easily.

Performance expectations (relative to the use of reverse osmosis membranes) include:
Up to 5x increase in flux across the membrane 
Fouling reduction of up to 80%
Approximately 100x less energy and pressure required.  (This claim was reported by Reuters.  Lockheed Martin's current product datasheet predicts a more modest reduction in energy consumption: 10 - 20%.)

In addition to the desalination industry, Lockheed Martin plans to market Perforene variants in the following fields:
 Waste water treatment 
 Pharmaceutical material harvest and purification
 Energy/power generation 
 Mining
 Food and beverage
 Manufacturing

The product was not expected to be released until 2020.

Media reaction
Bruce Sterling commented for Wired, "if this graphene vaporware actually worked out in practice, we’d have to forgive Lockheed Martin for everything else they’ve ever done — plus maybe even give them Nobels and McMansion palaces in former deserts."

The Water Desalination Report writes that Lockheed Martin's claims that it had developed a membrane that will desalinate water “at a fraction of the cost of industry-standard RO systems” were "ridiculous and very premature."

References

External links
Descaling Systems & Water Softeners

Environmental issues with water
Filters
Fresh water
Lockheed Martin
Water supply
Water treatment
Water desalination
Water technology
Membrane technology
Emerging technologies
Graphene